= H. Govindaiah =

Kannada dalit poet

H. Govindaiah (born 1954) is a prominent Dalit poet writing in Kannada. He was associated with Dalit Sangharsha Samiti (DSS) and was the publisher of Panchama, a fortnightly magazine of DSS for ten years until 1985. He has worked as a lecturer at Mysore University and the Karnataka Open University and was Deputy Registrar of the latter for two years. In 2015, he was appointed as one of the members of the Karnataka Public Service Commission (KPSC).
